Kamran Younis (born 20 January 1985) is a Pakistani former first-class cricketer who played in 76 first class cricket, 78 List A cricket, and 19 Twenty20 cricket matches between 1999 and 2016.

References

External links
 

1985 births
Living people
Pakistani cricketers
Sialkot cricketers
Cricketers from Gujranwala
Gujranwala cricketers
Sialkot Stallions cricketers
Port Qasim Authority cricketers